The Caudron C.65 was a single seat biplane floatplane designed and built in France in 1922. Only one was completed.

Design and development

The C.65 was a conventional wire braced, two bay biplane, with equal span wings mounted without stagger. The interplane struts were in vertical, parallel pairs and vertical cabane struts joined the upper wing centre section to the upper fuselage longerons. There were ailerons only on the upper wings.

The C.65's engine was a  Clerget 9B nine cylinder rotary, cowled and driving a two blade propeller. The C.65 was piloted from a single, open cockpit under the wing. At the rear of the flat sided fuselage  there was a broad, triangular fin, carrying a straight edged rudder that extended down to the keel. As the tailplane was on the top of the fuselage, its elevators needed a cut-out for rudder movement.

The C.65 flew for the first time in January 1922, piloted by Poiré. Only one C.65 was built, though the C.66, a version with a  Hispano-Suiza 8Ab liquid-cooled V-8 engine had an otherwise similar airframe.

Operational history

It was still being flown in competitions in July 1923.

Variants
C.65  Clerget 9B 9-cylinder rotary engine.
C.66  Hispano-Suiza 8Ab liquid-cooled V-8 engine. 14% heavier and faster.

Specifications (C.65)

References

C.065
Floatplanes
1920s French sport aircraft
Biplanes
Aircraft first flown in 1922
Rotary-engined aircraft